Kalpaki is a former municipality in the Ioannina regional unit, Epirus, Greece. Since the 2011 local government reform it is part of the municipality Pogoni, of which it is a municipal unit. The municipal unit has an area of 116.756 km2, the community 13.189 km2. Population 1,719 (2011). The Greek National Road 20 connects Kalpaki with Ioannina and Konitsa. The GR-22 connects Kalpaki with Kakavia, the border crossing into southern Albania.

Subdivisions
The municipal unit Kalpaki is subdivided into the following communities (constituent villages in brackets):
Kalpaki (Kalpaki, Lioumpa)
Ano Ravenia
Chrysorrachi
Doliana (Doliana, Agios Georgios Dolianon)
Geroplatanos
Kato Ravenia
Mavrovouni
Negrades

Population

History

Kalpaki joined Greece after the Balkan Wars of 1913. The Battle of Elaia–Kalamas took place in the area in November 1940, during the Italian invasion of Greece.

See also
List of settlements in the Ioannina regional unit

External links
Kalpaki (municipality) on GTP Travel Pages
Kalpaki (town) on GTP Travel Pages

References

Populated places in Ioannina (regional unit)